Niketas Oryphas or Oöryphas ( or , fl. 860–873) was a distinguished Byzantine official, patrikios, and admiral under the Byzantine emperors Michael III (r. 842–867) and Basil I the Macedonian (r. 867–886), who achieved several naval victories against the Cretan Saracen raiders.

Biography

Under Michael III

Nothing is known of Niketas Ooryphas's early life. Several people surnamed Ooryphas are recorded in sources during the first half of the 9th century, all of them in high naval positions, but any family relation is conjectural.

Niketas Ooryphas first appears in our sources in 860, as urban prefect of Constantinople, when a Rus' fleet suddenly appeared in the entrance to the Bosporus and started pillaging the city's suburbs. In his capacity as urban prefect, Ooryphas made a report to Emperor Michael III, who was campaigning against the Arabs in Asia Minor. At a subsequent date, he was appointed in a position in the Byzantine navy, and in 867 he was in charge of the Imperial Fleet (droungarios tou ploïmou). As such he sailed with 100 ships in relief of Ragusa against an Arab siege which had already lasted 15 months, and restored the imperial suzerainty over the coasts of Dalmatia. It is, however, possible that Ooryphas already had naval experience, as he may be identifiable with one of the commanders of the 853 attack on Damietta.

Under Basil the Macedonian

Although he had risen to high rank under Michael III and had protested the usurpation of the Byzantine throne by Basil I the Macedonian in 867, Ooryphas was quickly won over and retained in office by the latter, and went on to become the perhaps most successful Byzantine admiral of his age.

In 869, Ooryphas led the Byzantine fleet that sailed in support of Louis II who was besieging Bari, but on arriving there, he found the Frankish army dispersed in winter quarters, and caused a diplomatic episode by referring to Louis, who claimed the title of Emperor of the Romans, merely as "king". As a result of the quarrel, the main part of the Byzantine force left, without participating in the siege of the city.

In , Ooryphas defeated the Cretan Saracens in the Gulf of Saros, and soon after followed this success with another: while the Saracens were campaigning off the western coasts of Greece, he had his men drag his ships overland across the Isthmus of Corinth, thereby surprising the Saracen fleet in the Corinthian Gulf and defeating them. Ooryphas subsequently disappears from the scene, although he may have led the Imperial Fleet in its actions for a few years before being replaced by the droungarios Nasar, including the recapture of Bari and, briefly, of Cyprus.

References

Sources

9th-century Byzantine military personnel
Byzantine admirals
Urban prefects of Constantinople
Patricii
Byzantine people of the Arab–Byzantine wars
Byzantine Dalmatia